Honey is the first EP by American pop artist and producer Brother Sundance. The EP was released on August 11, 2017, on Silent Majority Group, and features the singles "Blind" and "The Hurt."

Track listing

Personnel 
Brother Sundance: - programming (tracks 1-5), lead vocals, backing vocals (track 3, 4), guitar (track 5), synth bass (track 5), synths (track 5), gang vocals (track 1, 5)

Additional musicians:
 Max Landis - guitar (track 1,4), bass (track 5)
 Summer Wright - vocals (tracks 1-4)
 Kristina Palacios - vocals (track 1, 3 and 5)
 Ella Talerico - backing vocals (track 1, 5)
 Jamie Peacon - backing vocals (track 1, 4)
 Matthew Schneider - programming (track 2)

Production:
 Brother Sundance — executive production, production
 Paul Kronk — vocal production (tracks 1-3), engineering (tracks 1-3)
 Marc Lee — mixing, engineering (track 5)
 Chris Gehringer — mastering

Additional personnel:
 Rick Schmidt — A&R (tracks 1, 3)
 Brother Sundance — art direction, design
 Sebastian Borberg — photography
 David Herrera — photography

References 

2017 debut EPs